FAO Goodwill Ambassador is an official postnominal honorific title, title of authority, legal status and job description assigned to goodwill ambassadors and advocates who are designated by the United Nations. FAO goodwill ambassadors are celebrity advocates of the Food and Agriculture Organization of the United Nations that use their talent and fame to advocate for the organization. 

The Goodwill Ambassador Programme of the Food and Agriculture Organization of the United Nations has been in place since 1999. The main purpose of the programme is to increase public awareness and to disseminate information on issues related to food security and hunger.

FAO encourages its goodwill ambassadors to actively use their talents and influence, and to commit themselves personally and professionally, to assist the organization in raising public awareness of the urgent need to eradicate hunger, malnutrition and food insecurity, and in achieving the 2030 Sustainable Development Goals.

Past FAO ambassadors have included Celine Dion, Carl Lewis, Evo Morales, Youssou N'Dour and Susan Sarandon.

Types of FAO goodwill ambassadors 
FAO has three types of Goodwill Ambassadors:
 The FAO Global Goodwill Ambassador, who are worldwide known celebrities from the worlds of arts, sports, literature, sciences and other fields of public importance.
 The FAO Special Goodwill Ambassador, who are high-level personalities usually from the field of research or science, who have excelled in an area relevant to the one for which they become special Ambassadors.
 The FAO National Goodwill Ambassador, who are personalities with local appeal, the work of which they support mainly within the country of their nomination.

Current FAO goodwill ambassadors
Current goodwill ambassadors, and the year they were appointed:

See also 
 Goodwill Ambassador
 FAO Goodwill Ambassador
 UNDP Goodwill Ambassador
 UNHCR Goodwill Ambassador
 UNESCO Goodwill Ambassador
 UNODC Goodwill Ambassador
 UNFPA Goodwill Ambassador
 UNIDO Goodwill Ambassador
 UNICEF Goodwill Ambassador
 WFP Goodwill Ambassador
 WHO Goodwill Ambassador

References

External links 
Food and Agriculture Organization

Food and Agriculture Organization
Goodwill ambassador programmes
United Nations goodwill ambassadors